

1950

External links

1950
1950s in Burma